This is a complete list of head coaches for the Washington Commanders of the National Football League (NFL). There have been 30 head coaches for the team, including their time as the Boston Braves (1932), Boston Redskins (1933–1936), Washington Redskins (1937–2019), Washington Football Team (2020–2021), and Washington Commanders (2022–present).

Joe Gibbs is the only coach to have more than one tenure. Two different coaches have won NFL championships with the team: Ray Flaherty in 1937 and 1942, and Joe Gibbs in 1982, 1987 and 1991. Gibbs is the all-time leader in games coached and wins, and Dudley DeGroot leads all coaches in winning percentage with .737. Of all the coaches, seven have been elected into the Pro Football Hall of Fame: Ray Flaherty, Turk Edwards, Curly Lambeau, Otto Graham, Vince Lombardi, George Allen, and Gibbs.

Coaches

Footnotes

Notes

References

External links

 
 
 
 
 

 
Washington Football Team
Head coaches